The 1973 Copenhagen WCT, also known as the Copenhagen Professional Championships, was a men's tennis tournament played on indoor carpet courts in Copenhagen, Denmark. The tournament was part of Group B of the 1973 World Championship Tennis circuit. It was the inaugural edition of the event and was held from 11 February until 17 February 1973. Unseeded Roger Taylor won the singles title.

Finals

Singles
 Roger Taylor defeated  Marty Riessen 6–2, 6–3, 7–6(7–1)

Doubles
 Tom Gorman /  Erik van Dillen defeated  Mark Cox /  Graham Stilwell 6–4, 6–4

References

External links
 ITF – tournament edition details

Copenhagen WCT
Copenhagen Open